Khvoshab (also Romanized as Khvoshāb; also known as Khvoshāb Pā’īn Maḩalleh) is a village in Mazkureh Rural District, in the Central District of Sari County, Mazandaran Province, Iran. At the 2006 census, its population was 291, in 74 families.

References 

Populated places in Sari County